Victory Boulevard is a major thoroughfare on Staten Island, New York City, measuring approximately 8.0 miles (12.87 km). It stretches from the West Shore community of Travis to the upper East Shore communities of St. George and Tompkinsville. In the late 1940s, the portion of Victory Boulevard between Richmond Avenue and Forest Avenue was designated as New York State Route 439A (NY 439A). The section between Forest Avenue and Bay Street became part of NY 439 at the same time.

Route description
The street follows a path similar to the Staten Island Expressway, an integral Staten Island traffic route. Both roadways intersect Clove Road, Slosson Avenue, Todt Hill Road, Bradley Avenue, the Dr. Martin Luther King, Jr. Expressway, Richmond Avenue and the West Shore Expressway, as well as each other. Forest Avenue, too, is intersected by both roads; however, these two intersections are on opposite sides of the island.

Victory Boulevard is the only street on Staten Island that meets three different expressways by way of interchanges. It is exit 7 for the West Shore Expressway, exit 10 for the Staten Island Expressway westbound (exit 8 eastbound), and exit 11 for the Dr. Martin Luther King, Jr. Expressway.

A number of prominent Staten Island sites and events are located along Victory Boulevard. Among these are the Travis Independence Day Parade, the Sylvan Grove Cemetery, the Mid-Island Little League field, and the College of Staten Island (CSI, formerly the Willowbrook State School). The Bulls' Head Tavern, a pub known for its Tory meetings during the American Revolution, also stood on Victory Boulevard, on the corner with Richmond Avenue.

History
Victory Boulevard was established in 1816 by the Richmond Turnpike Company as the Richmond Turnpike. The toll road was owned by Daniel D. Tompkins, a prominent Staten Islander who, a year later, became Vice President of the United States. The route was "promoted as the fastest...from New York to Philadelphia." Ferries from Manhattan and Brooklyn would dock at the eastern end of the turnpike, at Bay Street. Horse-drawn carriages would carry passengers to Travis, known at the time as Long Neck or the New Blazing Star Ferry, whence a ferry would carry people over the Arthur Kill to Woodbridge Township, New Jersey. From the 1860s to 1930, Travis was known as Linoleumville, the home of America's first Linoleum factory.

After World War I, the Richmond Turnpike was renamed Victory Boulevard in honor of the allied victory. The segment of Victory Boulevard from Richmond Avenue (then-NY 440) in Bulls Head to Forest Avenue (then-NY 439) in Silver Lake was designated as NY 439A in the late 1940s. East of Forest Avenue, Victory Boulevard was designated as part of NY 439 down to Bay Street. Both designations were removed from Victory Boulevard .

Transportation
Victory Boulevard is primarily served by the S62 and S92 LTD, which serve the entire road, and the SIM32 express bus. The S46, S48, S61, S66, S91, S93, S96, S98, SIM3, SIM30, SIM33, SIM34 also use the boulevard for shorter distances.

The Staten Island Railway has a station at the eastern end of the road.

Major intersections

See also

References

External links

Streets in Staten Island
Boulevards in the United States
World War I memorials in the United States